The 2008 Men's EuroHockey Junior Championship was the 14th edition of the men's EuroHockey Junior Championship. It was held in San Sebastián, Spain from 20 to 26 July 2008.

The hosts Spain won the tournament for the third time after they defeated the defending champions the Netherlands 1–0 in the final. Germany won the bronze medal after defeating Belgium 4–3 in the third-place playoff.

The tournament also served as a qualifier for the 2009 Junior World Cup in Malaysia and Singapore. Teams from Spain, the Netherlands, Germany, Belgium, England and Poland all qualified.

Participating nations
Alongside the host nation, 7 teams competed in the tournament.

Results

Preliminary round

Pool A

Pool B

Fifth to eighth place classification

Pool C

First to fourth place classification

Semi-finals

Third and fourth place

Final

Statistics

Final standings

References

External links
 European Hockey Federation website

EuroHockey Junior Championship
Junior
EuroHockey Junior Championship
International field hockey competitions hosted by Spain
EuroHockey Junior Championship
Sport in San Sebastián
EuroHockey Championship